Borgoratto may refer to 2 Italian municipalities:

Borgoratto Alessandrino, in the Province of Alessandria, Piedmont
Borgoratto Mormorolo, in the Province of Pavia, Lombardy